The 100-Year Life is a 2016 self-help book by Lynda Gratton, professor of management practice at London Business School, and Andrew Scott, professor of economics at the same institution.

References

External links
 

2016 non-fiction books
Self-help books
Bloomsbury Publishing books